Sprout is an unincorporated community in  Nicholas County, Kentucky, United States. It was also known as Buzzard Roost or The Roost. The Sprout Post Office closed in 1907. Of note, the Buzzard Roost Post Office, closed in 1861.

The community was named after the local  family (a transcription error accounts for the error in spelling, which was never corrected).

References

Unincorporated communities in Nicholas County, Kentucky
Unincorporated communities in Kentucky